Hendrik "Bull" Verweij (12 September 1909 – 19 February 2010) was one of the founders of the Dutch offshore radio station Radio Veronica, and was president of the station from its founding in 1959 until 1975. He was born in Hilversum.
After Veronica was forced to stop, one of the DJs of the station, formed the Veronica Omroep Organisatie: a legal entity that grew out from a candidate broadcasting organisation to the largest broadcaster in the country.

The Veronica brothers 
Bull is one of the three initial brothers that formed together the management (and ownership) of the offshore radio station Veronica. From 1960 the offshore radio station transmits from a former German lightvessel the "Borkum Riff" and in 1964 the three brothers decide to buy a larger trawler that was destined for being scrapped: the Norderney.

Bull is the founder and driving force behind offshore radio in the Netherlands: he develops the business model for commercial radio in the Netherlands. Initially Bull, with his brothers Jaap and Dirk were in the textile trade. He realized that the existing Dutch public broadcasting system didn't appeal to the younger generation. The youth listened to foreign stations, such as Radio Luxemburg and Verweij decided to start an offshore radio station. Radio formats that are now common place, such as "horizontal programming" were introduced by Verweij.

He also introduced advertising on radio in The Netherlands: the public radio stations in those years were completely funded by the state and it was not possible for companies to reach out to the public via national radio-stations.  Bull Verweij is seen as the initiator of commercial broadcasting and modern radio formats in The Netherlands.

Controversy on Mebo II 
Another radioship was the Mebo II: the owners of Veronica had also invested in this ship when their owners Meister and Bollier needed extra cash, but with the deal that the Mebo II would transmit from the English coast (and targeted for the UK), but due to changes in the law the ship was forced to move, and despite the deal with Veronica they dropped anchor next to the Norderney and started targeting the Dutch audience. As the transmitters of the Mebo II were very powerful Veronica was afraid they would lose market-share to the Mebo II transmissions.  Also, the Dutch government threatened to ratify new international "Treaty of Stasbourgh": laws that would make offshore radio illegal which would also be the end of Veronica. 
Co-owner and advertising manager Norbert Jürgens advises Verweij to sabotage the anchors of the Mebo II so it would drift within the 6 mile-zone, bringing the ship within (legal) reach of Dutch law and getting it confiscated for having illegal radio transmission equipment on board. Unlike Veronica's Norderney the Mebo II has its own engines so these would have to be sabotaged as well before breaking the anchor chains.
Without discussing with Verweij, Jürgens changes the job for the 3 divers hired to sabotage the anchors and orders them to actually bomb an old-line in the engine room to start a fire that would force the Mebo II to be towed to the nearest harbour (or let the ship sink).
Execution of the plan goes wrong: when the crew on board the Mebo II hear the bomb explode they see a small boat sail away from the Mebo II towards the coast and an SOS call is sent out in the middle of the radio-show. The three divers, that were promised 25.000 Guilders to sabotage the ship, were arrested and that lead quickly towards Jürgens and also Verweij.
Veronica staff is demanding an explanation and threaten with a strike. Verweij appears on Dutch television revealing that he paid three divers 25.000 Guilders to get the Mebo II into territorial waters in a way which did not harm anybody on board. It was the plan to force the Mebo II inside the 6 nautical mile limit so that Dutch authorities could confiscate the "radio pirate" . Verweij has to admit that he was behind the sabotage but claims that his order to the divers was a sabotage without risk or violence: he claims that it was Jürgens alone who changed the plan without knowledge or approval from Verweij.  Nevertheless, both Jürgens and Verweij as well as the three divers are sentenced to one year in prison. He was later sentenced to three months in jail.

Verweij later accepted that, although sticking with his version of the story, he is fully responsible for the bombing and regrets being involved.

The plan completely backfires as the general public sympathizes with Radio Noordzee and the station gains popularity. The additional radioship and station targeting the Dutch marketplace as well as the very powerful signal from the Mebo II forms the direct reason for Dutch Parliament to vote in favor of ratifying the "Strasbourgh Treaty", leading to the closing down of Veronica and Radio Noordzee on 31 August 1974.

After Radio Veronica 
Verweij turned 100 years old in 2009 receiving an Lifetime Achievement Award from news anchor Arend Langenberg for his influence on Dutch commercial radio. He died in his sleep in a retirement home in Loosdrecht.

References

External link

1909 births
2010 deaths
Dutch businesspeople
Dutch centenarians
Men centenarians
People from Hilversum